Profetas y Frenéticos is a Chilean rockabilly band formed in 1991 by Luis González, Juan Pablo Rojas, Dagoberto González, Jorge Narea and Claudio Narea, a former Los Prisioneros band member.

During the band's existence it released two albums, Profetas y Frenéticos in 1991 and Nuevo Orden in 1992, this last one as an homage to the band New Order. None of the two albums reached sales above 10,000 copies.

References 

Chilean rock music groups
Rock en Español music groups
Musical groups established in 1991
1991 establishments in Chile